Oliktok Long Range Radar Site, DEW station POW-2 or NWS station A-19, is a United States Air Force radar site located  east-southeast of Point Barrow, Alaska.

History
The site built in 1957 to support the Distant Early Warning Line radar station at Point Barrow (POW-MAIN), which logistically supported it. It was named POW-2 during this period. It was operated by civilian contract workers.  DEW Line operations ceased in April 1995, and the personnel were relieved from their duties.

The radar station was upgraded with new radars and in 1990 was re-designated part of the North Warning System (NWS) as a Long Range Radar Site, A-19, equipped with a minimally attended AN/FPS-117 long-range surveillance radar.  In 1998 Pacific Air Forces initiated "Operation Clean Sweep", in which abandoned Cold War stations in Alaska were remediated and the land restored to its previous state.  The site remediation of the radar and support station was carried out by the 611th Civil Engineering Squadron at Elmendorf AFB, and remediation work was completed by 2005.

The site remains active and is manned by civilian contractors for periodic maintenance, and accessed by road from Deadhorse.  The airstrip is closed.

See also
 North Warning System
 Distant Early Warning Line
 Alaskan Air Command
 Eleventh Air Force

References 

  Oliktok Long Range Radar Site

Installations of the United States Air Force in Alaska
Radar stations of the United States Air Force
Airports in North Slope Borough, Alaska
Military installations in Alaska
1957 establishments in Alaska
Military installations established in 1957